Burmargiolestes is a genus of flatwings in the damselfly suborder Zygoptera, family Rhipidolestidae.

Species
 Burmargiolestes laidlawi Lieftinck, 1960
 Burmargiolestes melanothorax (Selys, 1891)

References

Calopterygoidea
Zygoptera genera